John Charles Gregory (born 11 May 1954) is an English former footballer. He has previously managed: Portsmouth, Plymouth Argyle, Wycombe Wanderers, Aston Villa, Derby County, Queens Park Rangers, Maccabi Ahi Nazareth, F.C. Ashdod, FC Kairat, Crawley Town and Chennaiyin. As a player, he was a versatile midfielder who started his career at Northampton Town and later played for Brighton & Hove Albion, QPR, Derby and Aston Villa. He won six caps for England.

Playing career
Gregory was born in Scunthorpe, Lincolnshire, where his father, Jack Gregory, was playing for Scunthorpe United. Gregory made his professional football debut in 1972, at the age of 18, when playing for Northampton Town. He scored eight goals in 187 games over the next five years, before being transferred to First Division Aston Villa in 1977.

Gregory was a considerable success at Aston Villa. Despite playing two divisions higher than he had ever done before, he adapted well to First Division football and scored 10 goals in 65 games over the next two seasons. During his time at Villa, Gregory became the only player to play in every outfield position, wearing every number from 2 to 11 over his two seasons with the club, which remained a record, until Steve Palmer of Watford achieved this with shirt numbers 1 to 14 including playing in goal, in 1997/98 season.

In 1979, Gregory signed for Brighton & Hove Albion, who had just won promotion to the First Division for the first time in their history. He scored seven goals in 72 games over the next two seasons before dropping down into the Second Division to sign for Queen's Park Rangers.

He was part of the QPR side that reached the FA Cup final in 1982 (losing to Tottenham Hotspur in a replay) and won promotion to the First Division a year later as Second Division champions. He also helped QPR finish fifth and qualify for the UEFA Cup in 1984, but 1984–85 was a tough season for Gregory and his colleagues after manager Terry Venables departed to Barcelona and successor Frank Sibley was unable to keep up QPR's good form. At the end of a difficult season in which QPR only narrowly stayed in the First Division, Gregory dropped down two divisions to sign for fallen giants Derby County.

Derby County, champions of England in 1972 and 1975, had fallen into the Third Division in 1984 and had failed to win promotion in 1984–85. Gregory was the centerpiece of their midfield as they achieved promotion to the Second Division at the end of the 1985–86 season and to the First Division (as Second Division champions) a year later. Gregory stayed for one season as Derby County survived their first top flight season for nearly a decade, before announcing his retirement as a player. He played a total of 93 league appearances for the Rams, scoring 22 goals.

When taking over as manager of Plymouth Argyle early in 1990, Gregory re-registered himself as a player. After being sacked as manager and replaced by Dave Kemp, he then played three games for the club. On departing from the Home Park club, he moved 300 miles north to play for Third Division Bolton Wanderers, making seven appearances before finally retiring as a player at the age of 36.

Managerial career
John started his management career in the 1970s as a player/manager of amateur teams in Northamptonshire.

His first two professional spells in management (between January 1989 and June 1990), first with Portsmouth and then with Plymouth Argyle, lasted just a few months each. Shortly afterwards, he linked up as a non-contract player with his former England and Northampton Town teammate Phil Neal, who was then manager at Bolton Wanderers.

He later worked under Brian Little on the coaching staff at Leicester City (1991–1994) and Aston Villa (1994–96) before moving back into management with Wycombe Wanderers in September 1996. Wycombe were bottom of Division Two when Gregory took over, but he oversaw a massive improvement in league form which saw the club climb up to a secure mid-table finish. However, the side he put together failed to progress any further, and they also suffered an embarrassing FA Cup exit to Basingstoke Town. Wycombe were performing well in February 1998 when Gregory quit to take the manager's job back at Aston Villa. He helped improve Villa's league form during the final 3 months of the 1997–98 season and they qualified for the UEFA Cup.

Halfway through the 1998–99 season, Villa were Premiership leaders but a slump in form saw the club eventually finish sixth in the final table and miss out on a first Premiership title. Villa reached the FA Cup final in 2000 but lost to Chelsea. Gregory quit in January 2002, with Villa going on to finish eighth that season.

Gregory's next spell in management was with Derby County (January 2002 – March 2003). When he took charge at Derby they were bottom of the Premiership, but after winning both of his first two games at the helm it looked as though he might be able to save them from relegation. Unfortunately, seven defeats from their final eight fixtures saw Derby slip out of the Premiership after six years. The club's financial problems meant that Gregory hadn't purchased any players during the 2002–03 season, and their subsequent form in Division One was disappointing.

He was sacked in March 2003 for alleged misconduct but later won £1 million in compensation for unfair dismissal. Due to the ongoing lawsuit, Gregory was unable to apply for another managerial position for some time, so he spent most of the next three years working as a television pundit.

On 20 September 2006 he was unveiled as manager of Queens Park Rangers. He replaced Gary Waddock, who had stepped down following a poor succession of results that had left the club bottom of the Football League Championship. This appointment caused a schism among QPR fans, some of whom saw Gregory's friendship with controversial chairman Gianni Paladini as a conflict of interest. After a decent start with successive victories over Hull City and Southampton, Rangers form dipped before winning three on the bounce (including a victory at (then) league leaders Cardiff City). Unfortunately, results did not continue to improve, and relegation looked a distinct possibility for Gregory's men. However, following a fine late season run, QPR beat Cardiff 1–0 at Loftus Road on 21 April 2007 to secure their Championship status for another year. Gregory was sacked as QPR manager on 1 October 2007, after another string of poor performances.

On 8 December 2009, Gregory was appointed the manager of Israeli club Maccabi Ahi Nazareth. He led them to relegation.

On 18 May 2010, Gregory signed a three-year contract with Israeli Premier League Club F.C. Ashdod. He resigned from Ashdod on 18 April 2011, with the club facing the possibility of relegation.

On 13 June 2011, Gregory was appointed the manager of Kazakh club FC Kairat from Almaty, Kazakhstan. Kairat survived relegation at the end of the 2011 season to the second tier of Kazakhstan football.

Gregory had his contract as manager of FC Kairat terminated in December 2011, and in April 2012 was paid $120,000 in compensation.

On 3 December 2013, Gregory was named as the manager of Crawley Town, replacing previous manager Richie Barker.

On 27 December 2014, after being Crawley Town manager for just over a year Gregory stepped down as manager due to health problems; on the same day Crawley Town named Welsh former international and former Wolverhampton Wanderers manager Dean Saunders as interim manager.

On 3 July 2017, Gregory signed as head coach of Chennaiyin in the Indian Super League.

On 17 March 2018, he led Chennaiyin to their second Indian Super League title by defeating Bengaluru 3–2 in the finals. On 19 March 2018, Gregory extended his contract for one year.

After which he resigned after a poor run of form in the 2019-20 season.

Career statistics

As a Player

As a Manager

Honours

Manager
Aston Villa
UEFA Intertoto Cup: 2001

Chennaiyin FC
Indian Super League: 2017–18

Individual
Indian Super League Coach of the Year: 2017-18
Premier League Manager of the Month: September 1998, September 2001

References

External links

 
 

1954 births
Living people
Sportspeople from Scunthorpe
Footballers from Lincolnshire
Association football midfielders
English footballers
England international footballers
Northampton Town F.C. players
Aston Villa F.C. players
Brighton & Hove Albion F.C. players
Queens Park Rangers F.C. players
Derby County F.C. players
Plymouth Argyle F.C. players
Bolton Wanderers F.C. players
English Football League players
English football managers
English expatriate football managers
Portsmouth F.C. managers
Wycombe Wanderers F.C. managers
Aston Villa F.C. managers
Derby County F.C. managers
Queens Park Rangers F.C. managers
F.C. Ashdod managers
English Football League managers
Premier League managers
Expatriate football managers in Israel
FC Kairat managers
Maccabi Ahi Nazareth F.C. managers
Crawley Town F.C. managers
Expatriate football managers in India
Indian Super League head coaches
Chennaiyin FC managers
FA Cup Final players